Dionisio de Avila, O. de M. (died 1552) was a Roman Catholic prelate who served as Bishop of Santorini (1539–1552).

Biography
Dionisio de Avilawas ordained a priest in the Order of the Blessed Virgin Mary of Mercy.
On 29 Oct 1539, he was appointed during the papacy of Pope Paul III as Bishop of Santorini.
He served as Bishop of Santorini until his death in 1552.

References 

16th-century Roman Catholic bishops in the Republic of Venice
Bishops appointed by Pope Paul III
1552 deaths
Mercedarian bishops